Elizabeth Hollingworth is a Trials Division justice at the Supreme Court of Victoria. She was appointed to the bench in June 2004, after a 15-year career as a lawyer beginning in 1989.

In June 2014, Hollingworth made an order banning any reporting, including on the affidavit provided by Gillian Bird, in Australia, about a case involving Securency International, a partially state-owned company at the time, allegedly involved in the bribery of officials to win currency printing contracts. The order was published by WikiLeaks in July 2014, and Hollingworth revoked the suppression order in June 2015.

On October 2, 2014, Hollingworth sentenced Dylan Closter to 9 years and 3 months (6 years non parole) over the one-punch death of David Cassai, which fueled David's mum to lobby for harsher sentencing in relation to 1 punch deaths.

On October 29, 2019, Hollingworth sentenced Codey Herrmann to 36 years (30 years non parole) over the murder of Aiia Maasarwe.

References

Judges of the Supreme Court of Victoria
Australian women judges
Living people
Place of birth missing (living people)
Year of birth missing (living people)